The Royal Norwegian Ministry of Health and Care Services (Helse- og omsorgsdepartementet) is a Norwegian government ministry in charge of health policy, public health, health care services, and health legislation in Norway. It is led by the Minister of Health and Care Services.

More specifically, the Ministry of Health and Care Services has the superior responsibility for providing the population with adequate health care services, including health promotion, based upon the principle of equality and health care services independent of habitation and financial circumstances.

The Minister of Health and Care Services is the head of the Ministry, and its political leader. The position is currently being held by Ingvild Kjerkol. The Norwegian Board of Health is a national government institution under the Ministry of Health and Care Services.

Subsidiaries
The ministry owns the four regional health authorities in Norway:
 Central Norway Regional Health Authority
 Northern Norway Regional Health Authority
 Southern and Eastern Norway Regional Health Authority
 Western Norway Regional Health Authority

It also is supreme of the following government agencies:
 Norwegian Directorate for Health and Social Affairs
 Norwegian Board of Health Supervision
 Norwegian Institute of Public Health
 Norwegian System of Compensation to Patients
 Norwegian Medicines Agency
 National Institute for Alcohol and Drug Research
 Norwegian Scientific Committee for Food Safety
 Norwegian Radiation Protection Authority
 Norwegian Labour and Welfare Service
 Norwegian Food Safety Authority
 Norwegian Biotechnology Advisory Board
 Statens helsepersonellnemnd
 Norwegian Patients' Injury Compensation Board
 Norwegian Governmental Appeal Board regarding medical treatment abroad

References

External links
 Ministry of Health and Care Services
 Norwegian Institute of Public Health
 Norwegian Board of Health Supervision
 Norwegian Directorate for Health and Social Affairs
 Norwegian Medicines Agency

Health and Care Services
Norway